Melpadi is an ancient small town in Vellore district in the Indian state of Tamil Nadu. It is on the western bank of Ponnai near the Palar River. It is located near Thiruvalam, 7 km from Ponnai.

Melpadi was a buffer state between the Chalukya and Chola dynasties. Raja Raja Chola's grandfather died there. Choleeswara of Arinjaya Chola was built by Raja Raja Chola along with Somanatheeswarar temple in Melpadi.

During the Sangam period the place was under the classification of "Mullai" land. Melpadi means "village on the western bank of the river".

The nearby village of Vinaygapuram hosts Vinayagar temple. 

During the Pallvas it was called Tunadu under Vanagopadi.

It is an agricultural town where the investment grains that are produced consist of rice and peanuts and peanut oil. The town was famous once upon a time for the very fine tasting "Kechilisamba" variety of rice grain. The peanut oil grown here also has fine aroma and thin consistency. 

The town has its own post office, library, police station and local panchayat. Initially the town had two long streets set parallel to each other. Because the town is located very close to the Pallar River the wide mouth wells had a constant supply of water and were utilized for agriculture. Prior to electricity and motorized pumps, bullock carts were utilized to raise water from the wells and for ploughing. Most of the landowners hired farmhands for agricultural labor. As years passed by the landowners donated the lands to these farmhands as a gesture of gratitude and service for several generations. The town claims lot of pride due to their tradition for giving generously along the same lines as "chola dynasty".

References

Cities and towns in Vellore district
Chola dynasty